The Roman Catholic Diocese of Chipata is a diocese located in Chipata in Zambia.

History
 July 1, 1937: Established as Apostolic Prefecture of Fort Jameson from the Apostolic Vicariate of Nyassa in Malawi 
 May 7, 1953: Promoted as Apostolic Vicariate of Fort Jameson 
 April 25, 1959: Promoted as Diocese of Fort Jameson 
 April 15, 1968: Renamed as Diocese of Chipata

Bishops
 Prefects Apostolic of Fort Jameson (Roman rite) 
 Fr. Fernand Martin, M. Afr. (1937.12.17 – 1946; Apostolic Administrator 1946 – 1947.03.07)
 Fr. Firmin Courtemanche, M. Afr. (1947.03.07 – 1953.05.07 see below)
 Vicar Apostolic of Fort Jameson (Roman rite) 
 Bishop Firmin Courtemanche, M. Afr. (see above 1953.05.07 – 1959.04.25 see below)
 Bishops of Fort Jameson (Roman rite) 
 Bishop Firmin Courtemanche, M. Afr. (see above 1959.04.25 – 1968.04.15 see below)
 Bishops of Chipata (Roman rite)
 Bishop Firmin Courtemanche, M. Afr. (see above 1968.04.15 – 1970.11.11)
 Bishop Medardo Joseph Mazombwe (1970.11.11 – 1996.11.30), appointed Archbishop of Lusaka; future Cardinal
 Bishop George Cosmas Zumaire Lungu (since 2002.12.23)

Auxiliary Bishop
Benjamin S. Phiri (2011-2020), appointed Bishop of Ndola)

See also
Roman Catholicism in Zambia

Sources
 GCatholic.org
 Catholic Hierarchy

Roman Catholic dioceses in Zambia
Christian organizations established in 1937
Roman Catholic dioceses and prelatures established in the 20th century
1937 establishments in Northern Rhodesia
Roman Catholic Ecclesiastical Province of Lusaka